Tiantongyuan is a suburb in northern Beijing's Changping District.  As of April 2008, it was said to have over 400,000 residents. As of 2019, the population of Tiantongyuan had jumped to 700,000, making it the largest Xiaoqu (housing community) in China, and the suburb accounts for 3% of the population of Beijing.

Both Beijing Subway Line 5 and the BRT3 bus serve the area, as do many other Beijing public buses. There are two large bus hubs at Tiantongyuan North subway station and Tiantongyuan North neighborhood. Future expansion of the subway system will see Tiantongyuan acquire two new stations.

Tiantongyuan North Station is the northern terminus of Line 5 of the bus system.  There are two other Line 5 stations in Tiantongyuan, as well, namely Tiantongyuan and Tiantongyuan South. A subway journey from Tiantongyuan to Dongdan Station (which is on Line 5 in the very center of Beijing, close to the Forbidden City) takes about 35 minutes.

Tiantongyuan has two shopping malls, namely Longde Plaza (龙德广场, Lóngdé guǎngchǎng) and BHG Mall (北京华联天通苑购物中心, Beǐjīng Huálián Tiāntōngyuàn gòuwù zhōngxīn). These malls are about a kilometer apart. Longde Plaza contains a branch of Carrefour.

Tiantongyuan is divided into Tiantongyuan West (天通西苑), Tiantongyuan East (天通东苑), Tiantongyuan North (天通北苑), Central Tiantongyuan (天通中苑), and Old Tiantongyuan (本区 or 老区); each such neighborhood is further subdivided into sections 1, 2, and 3 (except for Central Tiantongyuan, which is divided into North, South, East, and West and east north).

During the early decades of the People's Republic, the area had been the site of a labor camp for class enemies.

References

Neighbourhoods of Beijing
Changping District